Béma is a rural commune and small town in the Cercle of Diéma in the Kayes Region of western Mali. The commune contains 24 villages and hamlets. In the 2009 census, the commune had a population of 25,749.

References

Communes of Kayes Region